Tay Ping Hui (born 10 November 1970) is a Singaporean actor and director. In 2014, Tay made his directorial debut with the basketball film Meeting the Giant.

Early life
Tay attended Catholic High School (Primary and Secondary) and Catholic Junior College. He was conferred a Bachelor of Arts degree with a double major in Economics and Political Science from the Faculty of Arts and Social Sciences of the National University of Singapore.

Career
After he graduated from university, Tay was the General Manager of an American food and beverage franchise and was planning to pursue a MBA at Harvard University before he was scouted to join TCS (later MediaCorp). Barely a year after his debut in On the Edge - Mr Personality, Tay won the "Best Supporting Actor" award at the 1999 Star Awards for his portrayal of a gang leader in Stepping Out. His breakthrough is As You Like It in 2000. After that, he became directors' leading man choice, acting in numerous television dramas. Tay also acted in Hong Kong film productions such as Summer Holiday directed by Jingle Ma, starring with Hong Kong actress Sammi Cheng, and "Infernal Affairs II" alongside Anthony Wong and Francis Ng.

Proficiently bilingual in both English and Mandarin, Tay also starred in MediaCorp's English-language channel, Channel 5 dramas like A War Diary- a television drama set in Japanese-occupied Singapore during World War II, playing a resistance fighter and garnering rave reviews. Other prominent works included "Brothers 4" and "Keong Saik Street", where he was the top billing actor, and most recently, in the Channel 5 long-running drama Tanglin.

Tay also performed in stage play Butterflies are Free, handpicked by Hong Kong film director Clifton Ko. And most recently, mandarin stage musical Don't Forget to Say Good Bye.

Tay has been nominated for the Best Actor in the Star Awards 2000, 2003, 2005, 2006, 2007, 2009, 2010, 2011 and 2012, playing coveted roles and excelling in major productions by MediaCorp. He has also been consistently been voted as one of the Top 10 Most Popular Male Artistes in the Star Awards 2000, 2001, 2003, 2004, 2005, 2006, 2007, 2009, 2010 and 2011, receiving the All-Time Favourite Artiste Award at Star Awards 2012. Tay has been voted Media's Top 5 Popular ward and was also in Lianhe Zaobao's " Top 50 Most Popular Asian Idol" for five consecutive years.

Tay starred as Huang Feihu in the China -produced supernatural fantasy television series The Legend and the Hero alongside China Megastar Fan Bin Bin, Liu De Kai and Taiwanese Star Ma Jing Tao. Since then, Tay has become a recognised face in China.

Tay played "manly" characters such as in C.I.D., Honour and Passion and C.L.I.F. but it was his role as a crude Ah beng-turned-chef in Bountiful Blessings that earned him his first Best Actor Award in Star Awards 2012. And for the Star Awards 2013, he won the Best Supporting Actor despite only being in 7 episodes of the TV series Unriddle 2.

In 2012, he received the All-Time Favourite Artiste award for obtaining Top 10 Most Popular Male Artistes.

In 2018, Tay left Mediacorp. He shifted his focus to acting in China and was most recently there to film a Chinese drama where he plays a spy. "I will be in China as and when I have projects there", he says. "Singapore is my home, I love my country".

Tay has signed on with Perfect World Pictures (Singapore) in 2018 and will be involved in a reboot of The Awakening in a starring role.

In March 2023, Tay joined the cast in the second season of Titoudao, a televised drama adaptation of a stageplay with the same title.

Other
Tay has also performed live numerous times on stage for events such as National Day and New Year's Day countdown and has performed alongside Taiwanese stars Wu Bai and Harlem Yu. He has also performed the theme songs of several MediaCorp series such as The Unbeatables III and Double Happiness I. His recording of Follow Me from Honour and Passion was named the Best Drama Theme Song at the Star Awards 2007.

In 2013, Tay completed his feature film directorial debut with a Singapore/China co-production Meeting the Giants, first of its kind in such collaboration in the local movie industry. The movie was screened in Singapore and China.

Personal life 
In 2010, Tay married a university lecturer.

Filmography

Television

Film

Discography
Drama Soundtracks

Awards and nominations

References

External links
 Tay Ping Hui's profile on xinmsn

20th-century Singaporean male actors
21st-century Singaporean male actors
Singaporean male television actors
Singaporean male film actors
Singaporean film directors
Living people
Singaporean people of Hokkien descent
National University of Singapore alumni
Catholic Junior College alumni
Catholic High School, Singapore alumni
1970 births